Fusarium oxysporum f.sp. cattleyae is a fungal plant pathogen.

References

oxysporum f.sp. cattleyae
Fungal plant pathogens and diseases
Forma specialis taxa